Dekargaon railway station is a railway station located in Sonitpur district of Assam, India.

The railway station was opened on 4 January 2014.

References

External links
 

Railway stations in Sonitpur district
Rangiya railway division
Transport in Tezpur